Antoine Nabil Andari (born 8 November 1949 in Billa, Lebanon) is Curial Bishop of the Maronite Catholic Patriarchate of Antioch and Auxiliary Bishop to Jounieh .

Life

Antoine Nabil Andari received on 27 August 1977 the sacrament of ordination to the priesthood.
As a priest:

1978 - 1985 :Assistant priest of the Parish of Chekka

1982 - 1983 and 1988 - 1989 :Professor at the Faculty of Theology of the Holy Spirit University of Kaslik

1986 - 1995 :Rector of the Maronite Patriarchal Seminary - Ghazir.

1987 - 1995 :Secretary of the Association of Major Catholic Seminaries in Lebanon.

1995 - 1997 :Assistant priest of Our Lady of Lebanon - Paris

On 7 June 1997 he was appointed by Pope John Paul II titular bishop of Tarsus dei Maroniti and was named Curial Bishop of the Maronite Patriarchate of Antioch. Maronite Patriarch of Antioch Cardinal Nasrallah Boutros Sfeir ordained him on 1 November of the same year to the episcopate. His co-consecrators were the auxiliary bishop of the diocese of Joubbé and Sarba, Francis Némé Baïssari, and the Archbishop of the Archeparchy of Antelias, Joseph Mohsen Béchara.

Certificates

He completed his secondary studies at Saint Maron Seminary - Ghazir

June 1970: Baccalaureate Second Division - Philosophy.

July 1974: Teaching degree in Philosophy.

June 1977: Bachelor of Theology.

1977 - 1978 In-depth lessons in philosophy DEA

He completed his university studies at Saint Joseph University - Beirut, and the Catholic University of Louvain - Belgium.

He is fluent in Arabic, French, English, Latin and Syriac.

References

External links

1949 births
Lebanese Maronites
Living people
21st-century Maronite Catholic bishops
20th-century Maronite Catholic bishops